Elachista micalis is a moth of the family Elachistidae. It is found from the Pelion Plains to the Pelion Gap area in Tasmania.

The forewings of the males are metallic blue basally with shiny dark bronzy brown scales distally. Females have black forewings with a bronzy sheen and five metallic blue markings. The hindwings of both sexes are dark grey.

References

Moths described in 2011
Endemic fauna of Tasmania
micalis
Moths of Australia
Taxa named by Lauri Kaila